Stanyslav Kashtanov (born 31 July 1984 in Donetsk) is a Ukrainian (until 2014) and Russian (since 2015) boxer.

Career
He captured the interim WBA (2012—2013) super middleweight belt on November 10, 2012, in Donetsk, Ukraine, against Server Yemurlayev of Ukraine by twelve-round unanimous decision. Champion of Russia among professionals in the light heavyweight (2015).

References

External links
 

|-

1984 births
Living people
Ukrainian male boxers
Sportspeople from Donetsk
Russian male boxers
Super-middleweight boxers
Naturalised citizens of Russia
Ukrainian emigrants to Russia